Zayachye is a rural locality (a selo) and the administrative center of Zayachenskoye Rural Settlement, Korochansky District, Belgorod Oblast, Russia. The population was 685 as of 2010. There are 14 streets.

Geography 
Zayachye is located 19 km southwest of Korocha (the district's administrative centre) by road. Khryashchevoye is the nearest rural locality.

References 

Rural localities in Korochansky District